Pawai Assembly constituency is one of the 230 Vidhan Sabha (Legislative Assembly) constituencies of Madhya Pradesh state in central India. This constituency came into existence in 1951 as one of the 48 Vidhan Sabha constituencies of the erstwhile Vindhya Pradesh state.

Overview
Pawai (constituency number 58) is one of the 3 Vidhan Sabha constituencies located in Panna district. This constituency covers the entire Pawai and Shahnagar tehsils of the district.

Pawai is part of Khajuraho Lok Sabha constituency along with seven other Vidhan Sabha segments, namely, Gunnaor and Panna in this district, Chandla and Rajnagar in Chhatarpur district and Vijayraghavgarh, Murwara and Bahoriband in Katni district.

Members of Legislative Assembly

As a constituency of Madhya Bharat
 1951: Bhura, Indian National Congress / Narendra Singh, Indian National Congress

As a constituency of Madhya Pradesh

Election results

2013 results

2018 results

See also
 Pawai

References

Panna district
Assembly constituencies of Madhya Pradesh